The El Barranco Community Ditch in Los Brazos, New Mexico is a  long irrigation ditch diverting water from the Rio Chama.  It was dug before 1907.  It was listed on the National Register of Historic Places in 1986.

It extends from the Chama River at Chama Division to the Upper Brazos Ditch.

References

Irrigation canals		
National Register of Historic Places in Rio Arriba County, New Mexico